Peter Donebauer (born 1947) is an English video artist known for designing and building the Videokalos video synthesizer.

Life and work 

Peter Donebauer studied at Manchester University and the Royal College of Art, London.

He is best known for his video artwork 'Entering', part of his seven-part 'Creation Cycle'. This was the first video piece to be commissioned and nationally broadcast by the BBC on 'Second House'. It was created in real-time at the Royal College of Art television studio and transmitted via a live microwave link to Broadcasting House where it was recorded for later broadcast.

In 1975-76, Donebauer partnered with Richard Monkhouse to develop the Videokalos colour synthesizer. It decoded the video signal into its red, green and blue components allowing for complex mixing and interlayering of colours and images. The device allowed “video” to be “played live” like a musical instrument.

Utilising the Videokalos synthesiser, Donebauer founded the Video And Music Performers (VAMP) delivering live interactive performances created between video and music performers. VAMP toured the UK in 1978-79 and had a retrospective performance at Tate Britain in 2006.

Donebauer created other commissioned works within The Creation Cycle, including 'Struggling', a part of his Arts Council award produced in 1974, and three works commissioned by the British Film Institute: 'Circling' and 'Teeming' in 1975, and 'Dawn Creation' in 1976. In 1980 he produced 'Moving' for the Calouste Gulbenkian Foundation and in 1980-81 'The Water Cycle' for Thorn-EMI. Later works include the 'Mandala' Cycle, 1991, and 'Thames Reflections', 2003.

In 1981 he partnered with David Graham to found Diverse Production, producing political programming for the newly formed Channel 4.

References

External links 
 Artist Website
 Interview with the Artist
 Artist Profile at Motion Image Research

British video artists
Alumni of the University of Manchester
Alumni of the Royal College of Art
Living people
1947 births
English contemporary artists